Terry Duguid  (born 1954 or 1955) is a Canadian politician who has served as the member of Parliament (MP) for Winnipeg South since 2015. He has campaigned for elected office at the municipal, provincial and federal levels, and served as a city councillor in Winnipeg from 1989 to 1995.

Background 
Duguid is the son of professional curling athlete Don Duguid. Duguid holds a Bachelor of Science degree in Biology and a Master's Degree in Environmental Science.  He has been involved a variety of eco-business pursuits in the Winnipeg area, including being president of Sustainable Development International, and serving as chairman of the Manitoba Clean Environment Commission.  He was president and CEO of the Gateway North Marketing Agency, which is responsible for ensuring the survival of the Port of Churchill and the Hudson Bay Rail Line. He is also the founding president of the International Centre for Infectious Diseases, a not-for-profit organization created after the outbreak of SARS to support and enhance the mandate of the Public Health Agency of Canada.

Career
Prior to his entry to politics Duguid was a long-time environmental activist. He was executive director of the Manitoba Liberal Party in the 1980s.

He served as a member of Winnipeg City Council from 1989 to 1995 for the wards of Miles MacDonell (20,000 constituents) and North Kildonan (40,000 constituents). He was chairman of the Public Works Committee. In that position he helped create Winnipeg's blue box recycling program. He stepped down as councillor to run for mayor of Winnipeg in 1995, but the incumbent mayor, Susan Thompson, was re-elected.

Post-city council
After municipal politics, Duguid had a successful career as a leader and executive in the not-for-profit sector. From 1995 to 1997 he was president and CEO of Gateway North International, working to secure a future for the rail line that leads to the Port of Churchill. He oversaw the transfer of both the rail line and the port, together worth $100 million, to a new owner.

From 1997 to 2000 he was president of Sustainable Development International, a consulting firm specializing in conservation and international management. From 2000 to 2004, Duguid was chairman of Manitoba's Clean Environment Commission, which is responsible for carrying out public hearings for major development projects, including forestry and hydro-electric development.

Duguid was the founding president of the International Centre for Infectious Diseases in Winnipeg, beginning as such in 2004 and serving until 2009. Duguid had been part of the original task force that set out to make recommendations to improve Canada's response to infectious disease outbreaks in the wake of the SARS epidemic of 2003, especially in Toronto. The task force recommended the establishment of ICID and the Public Health Agency of Canada, with both to be located in Winnipeg.

Federal elections

In the 2004 Canadian federal election, Duguid was the Liberal candidate in the north Winnipeg riding of Kildonan—St. Paul, a riding previously held by Liberal MP Rey Pagtakhan, who chose to run in a different riding. Duguid narrowly lost (13582 votes to 13304) to Conservative candidate Joy Smith. He ran against Smith again in 2006, but Smith was re-elected in an election that saw the Conservatives win a minority government.

Duguid ran as the Liberal candidate in the riding of Winnipeg South in the 2011 Canadian federal election. He finished second behind the incumbent Conservative, Rod Bruinooge.

Winnipeg South Member of Parliament
The 2015 federal election again saw Duguid running as the Liberal candidate in Winnipeg South; this time he was elected as the Liberals replaced the Conservative majority government with one of their own, which also included winning six of Winnipeg's other seven House seats. After the election Duguid was appointed as parliamentary secretary to the Minister of Families, Children, and Social Development, Jean-Yves Duclos. Duguid was then named Parliamentary Secretary for the Status of Women on January 28, 2017, serving under Maryam Monsef. He was a member of the Canada-China Legislative Association and served as vice-chair of the group. He traveled together with multi-party colleagues of the association for a two-week tour through China in August 2017. Duguid was also a member and vice-chair of the Canada-Africa Parliamentary Association.

Duguid was appointed the government lead for the efforts to clean-up Lake Winnipeg by Catherine McKenna, Minister of Environment and Climate Change, in November 2017. He would direct $25.7 million in federal spending which flow through the Lake Winnipeg Basin Program to address toxic algae blooms. Duguid has served as the Parliamentary Secretary to the Minister of Environment and Climate Change since December 3rd 2021.

Electoral results

Federal

Municipal

Provincial

|Progressive Conservative
|Harold Neufeld
| style="text-align:right;" |3,893
| style="text-align:right;" |42.33
| style="text-align:right;" |

|- style="background-color:white"
! style="text-align:right;" colspan=3 |Total valid votes
! style="text-align:right;" |
! style="text-align:right;" |100.00
! style="text-align:right;" |
|- style="background-color:white"
! style="text-align:right;" colspan=3 |Rejected votes
! style="text-align:right;" |25
! style="text-align:right;" |
! style="text-align:right;" |
|- style="background-color:white"
! style="text-align:right;" colspan=3 |Turnout
! style="text-align:right;" |9,222
! style="text-align:right;" |74.46
! style="text-align:right;" |
|- style="background-color:white"
! style="text-align:right;" colspan=3 |Registered voters
! style="text-align:right;" |12,385
! style="text-align:right;" |
! style="text-align:right;" |

References

External links

1950s births
Living people
Winnipeg city councillors
Canadian people of Scottish descent
Canadian people of Ukrainian descent
Liberal Party of Canada MPs
Members of the House of Commons of Canada from Manitoba
Carleton University alumni
University of Calgary alumni
21st-century Canadian politicians